Manjula Vijayakumar (4 July 195423 July 2013) was an Indian actress. She acted in more than 100 films in South Indian languages like Tamil, Telugu, Kannada and Malayalam.

Personal life
She and actor Vijayakumar got married in 1976. The couple have three daughters, Vanitha, Preetha and Sridevi. Arun Vijay, Anitha, and Kavitha are her husband's children from his first marriage. Sanjeev and Sindhu are her nephew and niece respectively (elder sister's son and daughter respectively).

Acting career
She first appeared in the film Shanthi Nilayam (1969) in a supporting role (as the teenaged niece of Gemini Ganesan's character). Her first lead role was in Rickshawkaran (1971). She acted in lead roles in many films till the late seventies. Since the late 80's, she has appeared in supporting roles. Manjula has performed alongside R. Muthuraman, Sivaji Ganesan, Gemini Ganesan, M. G. Ramachandran, Nandamuri Taraka Rama Rao, Akkineni Nageswara Rao, Krishna, Shobhan Babu, Kamal Haasan, Vishnuvardhan and Rajinikanth.

Death
Manjula died on 23 July 2013 in SRMC at Chennai after falling down from bed and being admitted to hospital. Her death was caused by kidney failure and a blood clot in the stomach.

Partial filmography

Television
 Nandini (Deceased character in photograph) 
 Unnai Paarkum Neram as Uma's aunty.
Sundarakanda as Mahalakshmi
Wow - Game Show

References

External links
 

1953 births
2013 deaths
Actresses in Tamil cinema
Actresses in Kannada cinema
Actresses in Telugu cinema
Actresses in Hindi cinema
Accidental deaths from falls
Accidental deaths in India
Actresses in Malayalam cinema
Indian film actresses
20th-century Indian actresses
21st-century Indian actresses
Actresses in Tamil television